Antonio "Pocholo" Martínez (20 June 1926 – 26 December 2016) was a Filipino basketball player who competed in the 1948 Summer Olympics and the 1952 Summer Olympics.

Biography
Martínez usually played guard and saw action in the first Asian Games in New Delhi in 1951 and the 1952 Summer Olympics in Helsinki. He played for De La Salle before the last war. It was during the war years that he took up the game. After liberation, Martínez played for the San Beda junior team under coach Arturo Rius from whom he learned the fundamentals of basketball. There was no NCAA at that time so he played against American teams which belonged to the liberation forces.

He then transferred to University of Santo Tomas to take up commerce. In 1949, he played for PRATRA in the MICAA along with playing coach Gabby Fajardo and among others, Ning and Emy Ramos, Pong Bautista and Peping Tuason. In 1954, Martinez played for Philippine Air Lines, and then stayed longer with the YCO Painters from 1955-1968 and by the time he retired, Martínez had participated in at least five championships.

References

External links
 

1926 births
2016 deaths
Basketball players from Manila
Olympic basketball players of the Philippines
Basketball players at the 1952 Summer Olympics
Basketball players at the 1951 Asian Games
Asian Games medalists in basketball
Philippines men's national basketball team players
Filipino men's basketball players
University of Santo Tomas alumni
Asian Games gold medalists for the Philippines
Medalists at the 1951 Asian Games
UST Growling Tigers basketball players
San Beda Red Lions basketball players